Asha Menon (born 17 September 1960) is an Indian Judge. She is former Judge of Delhi High Court.

Career
Menon graduated in Economics from Lady Shri Ram College and passed LL.B from the University of Delhi in 1982. She completed LL.M from Kurukshetra University. In 1985 she appears in the Delhi Judicial Service and became a judge in 1986. She remained Member Secretary of Delhi State Legal Services Authority since 2008 to 2012. Menon was elevated to the post of permanent judge of the Delhi High Court on 27 May 2019. She was retired on 16 September 2022.

References 

1960 births
Living people
Judges of the Delhi High Court
Faculty of Law, University of Delhi alumni
People from Palakkad district
20th-century Indian lawyers
20th-century Indian women lawyers
21st-century Indian judges
21st-century Indian women judges